Kuenstler Script is a formal script typeface. The primary  weight was designed in 1902 by the in-house studio at the D Stempel AG foundry. It was originally titled Künstlerschreibschrift, which translates from German to English as "handwriting of artists". The face is based on late nineteenth-century English copperplate scripts. Those faces in turn took inspiration from earlier eighteenth century writing masters George Bickham and George Shelley, both of whom worked in a writing style called round hand. In 1957, Hans Bohn added to the typeface family with Kuenstler Script Black, a heavy weight of the face.

References
Blackwell, Lewis. 20th Century Type. Yale University Press: 2004. .
Fiedl, Frederich, Nicholas Ott and Bernard Stein. Typography: An Encyclopedic Survey of Type Design and Techniques Through History. Black Dog & Leventhal: 1998. .
Jaspert, W. Pincus, W. Turner Berry and A.F. Johnson. The Encyclopedia of Type Faces. Blandford Press Lts.: 1953, 1983. .
Macmillan, Neil. An A–Z of Type Designers. Yale University Press: 2006. .

Stempel typefaces
Formal script typefaces
Letterpress typefaces
Photocomposition typefaces
Digital typefaces
Typefaces and fonts introduced in 1902